The 1986–87 Princeton Tigers men's basketball team represented Princeton University in intercollegiate college basketball during the 1986–87 NCAA Division I men's basketball season. The head coach was Pete Carril and the team captain was Joe Scott. The team played its home games in the Jadwin Gymnasium on the University campus in Princeton, New Jersey.  The team finished second in the Ivy League, earning no postseason invitation to either the 1987 NCAA Men's Division I Basketball Tournament or the 1987 National Invitation Tournament. The team won its last five games to finish the season with a 16–9 overall record and a 9–5 conference record. However, they finished one game behind a 10–4 Penn Quaker team in the conference race.

The team was led by second team All-Ivy League selection Scott and Alan Williams. Although the previous teams of 1983, 1984 and 1986 as well as subsequent teams of 1989–2000 would highlight defense and lead the nation in scoring defense, this team and the subsequent 1998 team highlighted the effective shooting of the Princeton offense.  Williams led the nation as the statistical champion in field goal percentage with a 70.3% average on 163 baskets on 232 attempts.  Meanwhile, the team led the nation in the same category with a 54.1% on 601 out of 1111 shooting.  Williams 70.3% field goal percentage in all games continues to stand as an Ivy League single-season record, and his 67.4% mark in conference games made him the conference's official statistical champion.

References

Princeton Tigers men's basketball seasons
Princeton Tigers
Princeton
Princeton